Emma J. Berman (born August 1, 2008) is an American actress best known for voicing Giulia Marcovaldo in Pixar's 2021 animated feature film Luca.

Early life
Berman was born in San Francisco, California to Russian-immigrant Jewish parents. She has an older brother named Mark and a cat named Peppa.

Career
Berman began her acting career performing in local theatre productions with the Bay Area Children's Theatre and 42nd Street Moon in San Francisco. She also voiced six of Leapfrog toys.

In 2021, she had her breakout role in Disney-Pixar's Luca as Giulia Marcovaldo, an outgoing and fun Italian girl who befriends Luca and Alberto.

Filmography

Film

Television

References

External links
 

2008 births
American film actresses
American television actresses
American voice actresses
American child actresses
21st-century American actresses
Jewish American actresses
American people of Russian-Jewish descent
Actresses from California
Actresses from San Francisco
Living people